Ricardo Ernesto Gómez (born 23 October 1981 in San Miguel de Tucumán) is an Argentine football midfielder.

Career
Gómez began his playing career in 2003 for Juventud Antoniana in the Argentine 2nd division, after the club were relegated in 2006 he joined Gimnasia y Esgrima de Jujuy where he soon established himself as a regular member of the first team squad.

After the relegation of Gimnasia at the end of the 2008-09 season Gómez joined Colón de Santa Fe.

External links
 Statistics at Irish Times
 BDFA profile
 Argentine Primera statistics

1981 births
Living people
Sportspeople from San Miguel de Tucumán
Argentine footballers
Association football midfielders
Argentine Primera División players
Primera Nacional players
Torneo Federal A players
Gimnasia y Esgrima de Jujuy footballers
Club Atlético Colón footballers
Rosario Central footballers
Juventud Antoniana footballers
Club Atlético Patronato footballers
Sportivo Belgrano footballers
Chacarita Juniors footballers